Bright Market, LLC, dba FastSpring, is a software as a service (SaaS) company that offers a full service e-commerce platform for companies that sell software and other online digital products.

History 

Founded in 2005 by Dan Engel, Ken White, Jason Foodman and Ryan Dewell, the company is based in Santa Barbara, California. The four founders put in a combined $30,000 to launch the company. FastSpring initially focused on companies selling desktop software and downloadable games, before moving into SaaS in 2011. In March 2011, FastSpring launched its subscription e-commerce platform for subscription-based businesses to manage online subscription payments. The company received its first outside investment in April 2013 for an estimated $12 million from Pylon Capital. The company's revenue would grow from less than $1 million in 2007 to over $100 million by 2013. In 2018, Accel-KKR purchased a majority stake in FastSpring.

FastSpring was recognized for a Silver Stevie Award for Customer Service Department of the Year in 2013 and again in 2014 and 2015. It is a five-time Inc. 5000 honoree, having been ranked as high as #41 in 2010.

In July 2018, Sian Wang was named CFO of the company. In March 2019, David Nachman was named CEO, succeeding Chris Lueck. Nachman was formerly CEO of government technology company Vision, and chief business officer of Velocify, a SaaS CRM business.

Products and services 

FastSpring's platform offers digital commerce products for software, cloud-based, and as-a-service businesses, supporting a variety of digital products and distribution models. It enables purchases and subscriptions for desktop, mobile, and apps.

 Global Online Payments
 Subscription Management + Billing
 Branded Checkout
 Global Taxes + Financial Services
 Risk Management + Compliance
 Integrations

References

External links 
 Official website

See also 

 Electronic commerce
 Software as a service

Companies based in Santa Barbara, California
Software companies based in California
Software companies established in 2005
Online payments
Subscription services
As a service
Software companies of the United States
2005 establishments in California
Companies established in 2005